Hedayatollah Gilanshah (1907–1986) was the commander of the Imperial Iranian Air Force for three terms. He was among the individuals who contributed to the development of the Iranian air force.  In addition, he was one of the army officers who played an active in the coup against Prime Minister Mohammad Mosaddegh in 1953.

Early life and education
Gilanshah was born in Tehran in 1907. He hailed from an aristocratic family. He graduated from the Officers’ Academy in Tehran. He was trained as a pilot in England and France. He joined further training programmes in England and the US.

Career and activities
Between 1950 and 1952 Gilanshah served as the head of the Iranian Soccer Association. In 1952 he was appointed as the chief of staff of the Iranian Air Force. He blamed Prime Minister Mohammad Mosaddegh for his early retirement and joined the anti-Mosaddeq officers. He was part of the pro-British army officers who were planning a coup against the government of Mosaddegh. The major members of this group included General Hassan Arfa, Brigadier General Teymur Bakhtiar and Colonel Hassan Akhavi. Gilanshah was promoted in rank after the coup which had removed Mosaddegh from office and was named as the chief of the Shah Mohammad Reza Pahlavi's military office. From 1954 to 1957 he was the chief of staff of the Iranian Air Force.

Later years and death
After leaving office he retired and died in 1986.

References

External links

1907 births
1986 deaths
Commanders of Imperial Iranian Air Force
Imperial Iranian Army lieutenant generals
People from Tehran
People of Pahlavi Iran
Presidents of Iranian Football Federation